Sonja Hogg (born December 20, 1945) is the former women's basketball program head coach at Louisiana Tech University and Baylor University. She posted an overall record of 307–55 at Louisiana Tech. Her record at Baylor in the Southwest Conference era was 24–33 overall (7–21 in conference). Hogg's record at Baylor in the Big 12 conference era was 59–58 overall (27–37 league mark). Her overall record at Baylor for all years was 83–91. Her combined overall record for her entire coaching career was 390–146.

Hogg was a physical education teacher at Ruston High School when she interviewed at Louisiana Tech for a position in its P.E. department.  School president Dr. F. Jay Taylor remarked that several students had approached him about starting a women's basketball team. He asked if she would be interested, and she agreed.

When Hogg began putting together the team, she nicknamed it the "Lady Techsters."  She felt the school's longtime nickname of Bulldogs was unfeminine, and disliked the idea that her players might be called "bitches" (a term for female dogs). She insisted that her players maintain standards and act like ladies off the court.

Hogg won the 1981 Association of Intercollegiate Athletics for Women title, beating Tennessee to finish the season undefeated at 34–0.  Her team won the first NCAA women's title in 1982.  From 1982 to 1985, she was co-head coach with her former top assistant, Leon Barmore, and completely turned over the reins to Barmore in 1985. Hogg coached at Deer Park High School from 1986 to 1988. She came out of retirement in 1994, and coached at Baylor for six years.

In 1986, Hogg was inducted into the Louisiana Tech University Athletic Hall of Fame. She received the 2004 Women's Naismith Outstanding Contribution to Basketball Award. In 2009, she was inducted to the Women's Basketball Hall of Fame, located in Knoxville, Tennessee. In June 2009, she was inducted into the Louisiana Sports Hall of Fame.

Head coaching record

Sources:

References 

1945 births
Living people
American women's basketball coaches
Baylor Bears women's basketball coaches
High school basketball coaches in the United States
Louisiana Tech Lady Techsters basketball coaches
Louisiana Tech University alumni
Louisiana Tech University faculty